École secondaire catholique Père-Philippe-Lamarche (commonly shortened to ESC Père-Philippe-Lamarche or ESCPPL), is a public separate French first language secondary school operated by the Conseil scolaire catholique MonAvenir. The school is located on Eglinton Avenue, in the Toronto neighbourhood of Eglinton East. It is the first public francophone separate secondary school situated in Scarborough.

The school was named after Father Père-Philippe-Lamarche, a member of the Catholic clergy who moved to Toronto in 1887. Lamarche founded the first French first language school in Toronto.

History
Before 1998, Metropolitan Separate School Board provided English, and French first language separate education in Metropolitan Toronto, including the former City of Scarborough. The school board's Section de langue française unit operated one secondary school in North York, École secondaire catholique Monseigneur-de-Charbonnel. In 1998, the school board's English and French language units were split into two, with the French language unit merging with several other regional French units to form Conseil scolaire de district catholique Centre-Sud (renamed Conseil scolaire catholique MonAvenir in 2017).

The new school board assumed control of Monseigneur-de-Charbonnel, which remained Toronto's only French first language separate secondary school until 2012, when the school board opened École secondaire catholique Saint-Frère-André in the western portion of Toronto. Prior to the opening of ESC Père-Philippe-Lamarche, the school board did not operate a secondary school in Scarborough, the easternmost district of Toronto.

In April 2011, Conseil scolaire Catholique du Centre-sud purchased property on Eglinton Avenue East from the Toronto Catholic District School Board. The  property was a vacant lot, designated as "Site 19" by TCDSB and was formerly reserved for future use. Conseil scolaire Catholique du Centre-sud began building a new secondary school on the property in 2015. 

Lamarche was officially opened on 5 September 2017 in a ceremony involving Mitzie Hunter, the Minister of Education, and Marie-France Lalonde, the Minister of Francophone Affairs. Lamarche was the first separate secondary school (English or French) to be opened in Scarborough since 1989, when St. Joan of Arc Catholic Academy opened. The school later held a blessing ceremony in November 2017, presided by Cardinal Thomas Christopher Collins, the Archbishop of Toronto. The new two-storey school was designed by IBI Group.

Notes

References

External links
 

Catholic secondary schools in Ontario
High schools in Toronto
French-language high schools in Ontario
Educational institutions established in 2017
2017 establishments in Ontario